Norne is an oil field located around  north of the Heidrun oil field in the Norwegian Sea. Norne lies in a licence which was awarded in 1986, and embraces blocks 6608/10 and 6608/11. The Alve field nearby started to produce in March 2009 and is commingling into Norne. The Urd field is also comingling with the Norne. 6507/3-1 Alve will be tied to Norne for processing and transport. Natural gas has also been exported from Norne since 2001. It travels through the Norne Gas Export Pipeline and the Åsgard Transport trunkline via Kårstø north of Stavanger to continental Europe.

Development
The Alve find led to the discovery of the Norne oil and gas field which was proven in 1992 and brought on stream in 1997. The field has been developed with a production and storage vessel, connected to six subsea wellhead templates.  Flexible risers carry the wellstream up to the vessel, which rotates around a cylindrical turret moored to the seabed. Risers and umbilicals are also connected to the turret. The ship has a processing plant on deck and storage tanks for stabilised oil.

Production
Production began from Norne in the Norwegian Sea on 6 November 1997. Originally, the shut down of Norne was scheduled for 2014. Nevertheless, Statoil announced in 2015 that they are considering to extend production until 2030.

Reservoir
The Norne reservoir is in Jurassic sandstones. Oil is mainly found in the Ile and Tofte formations, and gas in the Garn formation.

Recovery strategy
The oil is produced with water injection as drive mechanism.  Gas injection ceased in 2005 and all gas was planned to be exported. In order to avoid rapid pressure depletion in the gas cap, gas will be injected for an extended period of time.

See also 

 List of oil fields

References

External links 
Norne in Interactive Energy Map
Statoil
Norne oil reservoir simulation data available as Open Data

Oil fields in Norway